County Westmeath is a former UK Parliament constituency in Ireland, returning two Members of Parliament from 1801 to 1885 and one from 1918 to 1922.

Boundaries
This constituency comprised County Westmeath, except for the parliamentary borough of Athlone 1801–1885.

Members of Parliament

MPs 1801–1885

MPs 1918–1922

Elections

Elections in the 1830s

Elections in the 1840s

Elections in the 1850s

Elections in the 1860s

 

 

Greville-Nugent was appointed a Groom in Waiting to Queen Victoria, requiring a by-election.

Elections in the 1870s
Pollard-Urquhart's death caused a by-election.

Elections in the 1880s

Gill resigned, causing a by-election.

Election in the 1910s

Notes

References
The Parliaments of England by Henry Stooks Smith (1st edition published in three volumes 1844–50), 2nd edition edited (in one volume) by F.W.S. Craig (Political Reference Publications 1973)

 

Westminster constituencies in County Westmeath (historic)
Dáil constituencies in the Republic of Ireland (historic)
Constituencies of the Parliament of the United Kingdom established in 1801
Constituencies of the Parliament of the United Kingdom disestablished in 1885
Constituencies of the Parliament of the United Kingdom established in 1918
Constituencies of the Parliament of the United Kingdom disestablished in 1922